Yapu Qullu (Aymara yapu field, qullu mountain, "field mountain", also spelled Yapu Kkollu, Yapukkollu) is a dome in the Cordillera Occidental of Bolivia southeast of the summit of the Chullkani volcano. It is located in the Oruro Department, Sajama Province, Turco Municipality, east of the Sajama River and southwest of a plain named Titi Pampa.

References 

Volcanoes of Oruro Department